Columbia Basin may refer to:
 Columbia Plateau, the geographic region in the Pacific Northwest commonly referred to as the Columbia Basin
 Columbia Plateau (ecoregion), an ecoregion in the U.S. states of Oregon and Washington
 Columbia River drainage basin, a drainage basin covering parts of U.S. and Canada
 Columbia River Basalt Group, a set of rock layers that underlies the Columbia Plateau, above.

See also